Willowbank Wildlife Reserve is a wildlife park and nature reserve in Christchurch, New Zealand.

As well as having public displays of various animal species it also carries out conservation of native species including tuatara, kiwi, brown teal, and Duvaucel's gecko. Willowbank also holds the only pair of takahe on display in the South Island of New Zealand outside a Department of Conservation facility.

About 

Willowbank houses 95 species that are divided into three sections: exotics, heritage farmyard and New Zealand natives.

The exotics section house species from far and wide including blue and gold macaws, scarlett macaws, capybara, small-clawed otter, ring-tailed lemurs, black-and-white ruffed lemur, star tortoise, leopard tortoise and green iguana .

The heritage farmyard section works alongside the Rare Breeds Conservation Society holding and breeding species of farm animals that are dying breeds including Arapawa goats, Damara sheep, Enderby Island rabbits and zebu.

The New Zealand natives section houses species from around New Zealand including kea, kaka, North Island brown kiwi, South Island brown kiwi, Okarito brown kiwi, great spotted kiwi, morepork, New Zealand falcon and tuatara.

Willowbank supports and works alongside charitable organisations such as the New Zealand Conservation Trust and The South Island Wildlife Hospital.

History 
Willowbank Wildlife Reserve first open their doors in October 1974.

See also
Department of Conservation

References

External links

Willowbank Wildlife Reserve
South Island Wildlife Hospital
New Zealand Conservation Trust
Rare Breeds Society

Tourist attractions in Christchurch
Zoos in New Zealand
Parks in Christchurch
Wildlife sanctuaries of New Zealand
Nature reserves in New Zealand